Maryland House of Delegates District 34A is one of the 67 districts that compose the Maryland House of Delegates. Along with subdistrict 34B, it makes up the 34th district of the Maryland Senate. District 34A includes part of Harford County, and is represented by two delegates.

Demographic characteristics
As of the 2020 United States census, the district had a population of 86,491, of whom 66,273 (76.6%) were of voting age. The racial makeup of the district was 45,425 (52.5%) White, 27,586 (31.9%) African American, 385 (0.4%) Native American, 2,438 (2.8%) Asian, 50 (0.1%) Pacific Islander, 3,028 (3.5%) from some other race, and 7,504 (8.7%) from two or more races. Hispanic or Latino of any race were 6,893 (8.0%) of the population.

The district had 57,712 registered voters as of October 17, 2020, of whom 12,529 (21.7%) were registered as unaffiliated, 16,120 (27.9%) were registered as Republicans, 28,046 (48.6%) were registered as Democrats, and 575 (1.0%) were registered to other parties.

Past Election Results

2002

2006

2010

2014

2018

References

34A